The 1983 CONCACAF U-17 Championship was the first tournament in the Under-17 category organized by the CONCACAF. Trinidad and Tobago hosted the event between August 26 and September 3, and it was won by the United States.

Group stage
Top two in each group advance to semifinals.

Group A

Group B

Knockout stages

Semifinals

Third place play-off

Final

References

External links
 Official site

1983
U-17
1983
1983–84 in Costa Rican football
1983–84 in Mexican football
1983–84 in Honduran football
1983–84 in Salvadoran football
1983 in American soccer
1983 in Puerto Rican football
1983 in youth association football
1983 in Trinidad and Tobago sport